Berkner may refer to:
Berkner Island, the southernmost island of the world
Berkner (crater), a lunar crater
Laurie Berkner (born 1969), American musician
Lloyd Berkner (1905–1967), American physicist and engineer; also
 Lloyd V. Berkner High School in Richardson, Texas, named for him